Hintonella is a genus of flowering plants from the orchid family, Orchidaceae. It contains only one known species, Hintonella mexicana, native to central and southern Mexico (Jalisco, Guerrero, Mexico State, Morelos, Michoacán, Oaxaca).

See also 
 List of Orchidaceae genera

References 

 Pridgeon, A.M., Cribb, P.J., Chase, M.A. & Rasmussen, F. eds. (1999). Genera Orchidacearum 1. Oxford Univ. Press.
 Pridgeon, A.M., Cribb, P.J., Chase, M.A. & Rasmussen, F. eds. (2001). Genera Orchidacearum 2. Oxford Univ. Press.
 Pridgeon, A.M., Cribb, P.J., Chase, M.A. & Rasmussen, F. eds. (2003). Genera Orchidacearum 3. Oxford Univ. Press
 Berg Pana, H. 2005. Handbuch der Orchideen-Namen. Dictionary of Orchid Names. Dizionario dei nomi delle orchidee. Ulmer, Stuttgart

Oncidiinae
Monotypic Epidendroideae genera
Oncidiinae genera
Orchids of Mexico